This is a list of electricity-generating power stations in the U.S. state of New Jersey, sorted by type and name. In 2020, New Jersey had a total summer capacity of 17,424 MW through all of its power plants, and a net generation of 61,106 GWh. The corresponding electrical energy generation mix was 47.8% natural gas, 45.8% nuclear, 2.5% solar, 1.7% coal, 1.2% biomass, 1% non-biogenic waste, and 0.1% hydroelectric & wind.

New Jersey's renewable portfolio standard was updated in 2018 to require that 21% of electricity be from renewable sources by 2021, 35% by 2025, and 50% by 2030. In February 2023, Governor Phil Murphy set a goal of 100% clean electricity (including non-renewable zero-emissions sources) by 2035. About 75% of in-state renewable generation came from small- and large-scale solar photovoltaics (PV) that year. Small-scale solar, which includes customer-owned PV panels, delivered an additional net 2,693 GWh of energy to the state's electrical grid during 2021. This was nearly twice the generation of New Jersey's utility-scale PV plants.

Nuclear power stations
There are two nuclear power stations in New Jersey both operated by PSEG Nuclear. The Oyster Creek Nuclear Generating Station in Lacey Township owned and operated by Oyster Creek Environmental Protection permanently ceased operations on September 17, 2018.

Fossil-fuel power stations
Data from the U.S. Energy Information Administration serves as a general reference.

Natural gas

Petroleum

Renewable power stations
Data from the U.S. Energy Information Administration serves as a general reference.

Biomass and municipal waste
Additional data from New Jersey Department of Environmental Protection

Hydroelectric

Wind farms

Photovoltaic

As of January 2023, New Jersey has more than 90 photovoltaic installations of over 5 MW, which have a cumulative capacity of over 850 MW, and over 510 projects of over 1 MW, with a cumulative capacity of 1,680 MW. Most of these are net-metered. The largest in the state include (incomplete list; selected projects):

Storage power stations
Data from the U.S. Energy Information Administration serves as a general reference.

Battery storage

Pumped storage

Decommissioned plants

See also 

Hudson Project
PJM Interconnection
List of power stations in the United States
List of electric companies in New Jersey

References

External links 

 Energy Information Administration State Profile Analysis

Energy infrastructure in New Jersey
 
Lists of buildings and structures in New Jersey
New Jersey
Geographic coordinate lists